Al-Zubaydi may refer to:

Abu Bakr al-Zubaydi (d. 989), Andalusi writer
Mohammed Hamza Zubeidi (1938–2005), prime minister of Iraq
Mahir al-Zubaydi (d. 2008), al-Qaeda commander in Iraq
Abu Nabil al-Anbari (d. 2015), nom de guerre of Wissam Najm Abd Zayd al Zubaydi, Libyan ISIS leader
Sadoun al-Zubaydi (fl. 1991– ), Iraqi English professor and translator